Bryan McCall Hebson (born March 12, 1976) is a former Major League Baseball pitcher who played in  with the Montreal Expos.

Hebson attended Central High School in Phenix City, Alabama and initially committed to play college baseball at Tallahassee Community College. However, before his senior season, he reached out to Auburn University and asked that their baseball coaches watch him pitch. That year, he finished with a 1.54 earned run average and led his school to the state finals. In June, he accepted a scholarship to play for the Auburn Tigers baseball team.

In July 2003, he reached the majors for the first time after Expos pitcher Dan Smith was placed on the disabled list with an injury to his rotator cuff.

References

External links

1976 births
Living people
American expatriate baseball players in Canada
Auburn Tigers baseball players
Baseball players from Columbus, Georgia
Cape Fear Crocs players
Edmonton Trappers players
Gulf Coast Expos players
Gulf Coast Red Sox players
Harrisburg Senators players
Jupiter Hammerheads players
Major League Baseball pitchers
Montreal Expos players
Ottawa Lynx players
Pawtucket Red Sox players
Portland Sea Dogs players
Sarasota Red Sox players